The Wiener Bankverein or Bank-Verein (WBV) was a major bank in the Habsburg Monarchy and First Austrian Republic, founded in 1869. In 1888 it was the fourth-largest bank of Austria-Hungary by market capitalization, behind the Austro-Hungarian Bank, the Länderbank, and the Creditanstalt. It merged with the troubled Creditanstalt in 1934 to form Creditanstalt-Bankverein. Wiener Bankverein is thus one of the many predecessor entities of UniCredit, as the latter in 2005 acquired Bank Austria which itself had merged with Creditanstalt in 1997.

Habsburg era

The Wiener Bankverein's creation was sponsored in 1869 by the Allgemeine Bodencreditanstalt, which had been established in Vienna in 1863. It the late 19th century, the WBV became active in financing ventures in southeastern Europe including railways in the Balkans and petroleum production in Romania. In 1890, it founded the Hungarian Industrial and Commercial Bank in Budapest, with privileged tax status granted by ad hoc legislation. In 1895, it led the creation of the Landesbank für Bosnien und Herzegowina in Sarajevo. In 1906, it returned to Constantinople and opened a branch office there, soon followed by the construction of a prominent branch building inaugurated in 1912. It opened a branch in Zagreb in 1908. By 1912, it had the largest network of all Austrian joint-stock banks, with 49 branches in comparison to 31 for the Länderbank and 21 for the Creditanstalt. 

It opened a branch in Belgrade under Austro-Hungarian occupation in 1916 during World War I.

Austrian Republic

Following the war's end and post-war financial turmoil in the newly former First Austrian Republic, the Société Générale de Belgique (SGB) and its affiliate the Banque Belge pour l'Étranger (BBE) recapitalized Wiener Bankverein in 1920, joined in 1922 by Basler Handelsbank and in 1927 by Dillon, Read & Co.. 

In the 1934 Austrian bank merger, the recapitalized Creditanstalt took over all assets and liabilities of Wiener Bankverein as well as the viable operations of Niederösterreichische Escompte-Gesellschaft. The resulting merged entity adopted the name , in short Creditanstalt-Bankverein.

Affiliates in Czechoslovakia, Poland and Yugoslavia

As part of their restructuring of the WBV, the Société Générale de Belgique and Banque Belge pour l'Étranger created new domestic banks in the Empire's successor states, in which they initially had joint controlling ownership together with their partner the Basler Handelsbank:
 the General Bank Union in Poland in Lviv, formed in 1922 from 8 former WBV branches; it relocated to Warsaw in 1930, and was eventually liquidated in the late 1940s;
 the General Yugoslavian Bank Union (- AJB), formed in 1928 from the two former WBV branches in Belgrade and Zagreb. 

The latter gained prominence in the 1930s. In 1940, Deutsche Bank bought out the Belgian stake and became its dominant shareholder, with 88 percent held either directly or through Creditanstalt, also under Deutsche Bank's control since Anschluss in 1938. Deutsche Bank also owned the Landesbank für Bosnien und Herzegowina in Sarajevo. Their assets were confiscated by the newly established Communist authorities in October 1944 and subsequently liquidated.

Buildings

Vienna head office

From its foundation in 1869, the Wiener Bankverein's head office was at Herrengasse 6-8, later extended to what was then Herrengasse 10, in the former .

The WBV building on Schottengasse later became the headquarters of the merged Creditanstalt-Bankverein from 1934, then of Bank Austria from 1997, and of Bank Austria-Creditanstalt from 2002 to 2017. The building was then renovated and converted into a commercial compound branded , including an Interspar hypermarket, and inaugurated in 2021.

Other locations

The Wiener Bankverein also erected a branch office building in the Galata neighborhood of Constantinople, on a highly visible location at the northern entrance of the Golden Horn, designed by Gotthilf and Neumann and completed in 1912. In 1921, the property was acquired by the newly created Banque Française des Pays d'Orient. In the 1930s, it was used by the Turkish tobacco concern that had succeeded the Ottoman Tobacco Company in 1925, and in 1944 became a branch of Ziraat Bank.

Around that time, the WBV had branches in Agram (later Zagreb), Aussig an der Elbe (Ústí nad Labem), Bielitz-Biala (Bielsko-Biała), Brünn (Brno), Czernowitz (Chernivtsi), Graz, Karlsbad (Karlovy Vary), Klagenfurt, Krakau (Kraków), Lemberg (Lviv), Pilsen (Plzeň), and Teplitz (Teplice) in addition to Vienna, Prague and Constantinople.

A new branch building in Zagreb was designed by Gotthilf and Neumann and completed in 1923; it was renovated in the 2010s and converted into Amadria Park Hotel.

See also
 Creditanstalt
 Länderbank
 Anglo-Austrian Bank

Notes

Defunct banks of Austria